Limbobotys limbolalis is a moth in the family Crambidae. It was described by Frederic Moore in 1877. It is found in India (the Andamans).

References

Moths described in 1877
Pyraustinae